Dominik Greindl (born 27 July 1988 in Augsburg) is a German curler from Munich.

Personal life
Greindl works as a manager for PricewaterhouseCoopers.

Teams

References

External links

Video: 

1988 births
Living people
German male curlers
Sportspeople from Munich
Sportspeople from Augsburg
21st-century German people